The following is a timeline of the history of the city of Saint-Étienne, France.

Prior to 20th century

 1184 –  founded.
 1310 –  (church) construction begins.
 1790 – Town becomes part of the Rhône-et-Loire department.
 1793 – Town becomes part of the Loire (department).
 1800 – Population: 16,259.
 1816 – École nationale supérieure des mines de Saint-Étienne (school) established.
 1821 –  built.
 1828 – Saint-Étienne to Andrézieux Railway begins operating.
 1831 – Lyons-St Etienne railway begins operating.
 1855 – Beaubrun, Montaud, and Valbenoîte become part of Saint-Étienne.(fr)
 1856 – Loire (department) administration relocated to Saint-Étienne from Montbrison.
 1861 –  opens in the Palais des Arts.
 1863 – Planfoy becomes part of Saint-Étienne.(fr)
 1864 – Manufacture d'armes de Saint-Étienne factory built.
 1876 – Union des travailleurs de Saint-Étienne (labour union) consumers' co-operative created.
 1881 – Saint-Étienne tramway begins operating.
 1884 – Gare de Saint-Étienne-Châteaucreux rebuilt.
 1886 – Population: 117,875.
 1890 –  (school) built.
 1898 – Société des Magasins du Casino (shop) in business.
 1900 –  built.

20th century

 1901 – Automobile Club established.
 1902 –  constructed.
 1910 – Etoile Théâtre (cinema) opens.
 1911 – Population: 148,656.
 1922 –  established.
 1923 – Saint-Étienne Cathedral built.
 1926 – Population: 193,737.
 1930 –  founded.
 1933 –  (residence) built.
 1938 – Capitole cinema opens.
 1942 – Trolleybuses in Saint-Étienne in operation.
 1952 –  Lyon-St Etienne footrace begins.
 1962 – Population: 210,311.
 1968 – Population: 223,223.
 1969
 Jean Monnet University established.
  and  become part of Saint-Étienne.(fr)
 1971 –  (school) established.
 1973 –  becomes part of Saint-Étienne.(fr)
 1977
 March:  held.
  becomes mayor.
 1978 – Saint-Étienne–Bouthéon Airport terminal built.
 1981 – Radio Dio begins broadcasting.
 1987 – Modern Art Museum established.
 1990
 Massenet Festival begins.
 Population: 199,396.
 1993 – Médiathèque Centrale opens in Tarentaize.
 1995 –  (cultural festival) begins.

21st century

 2005 –  (music school) active.
 2011 – Population: 170,049.
 2014
 March:  held.
 Gaël Perdriau becomes mayor.
 2015 – December:  held.
 2016 – St Etienne becomes part of the Auvergne-Rhône-Alpes region.

Images

See also
 
 

other cities in the Auvergne-Rhône-Alpes region
 Timeline of Clermont-Ferrand
 Timeline of Grenoble
 Timeline of Lyon

References

This article incorporates information from the French Wikipedia.

Bibliography

in English

in French

External links

Saint-Étienne
saint etienne
saint etienne